In the Whirl of Life (German: Im Wirbel des Lebens) is a 1920 German silent film directed by Erik Lund.

The film's sets were designed by the art directors Siegfried Wroblewsky.

Cast
In alphabetical order
 Georg Alexander 
 Carl Fenz 
 Max Gülstorff 
 Paul Hartmann 
 Eva May 
 Hermann Picha
 Karl Plaen 
 Toni Tetzlaff 
 Leopold von Ledebur

References

Bibliography
 Hans-Michael Bock and Tim Bergfelder. The Concise Cinegraph: An Encyclopedia of German Cinema. Berghahn Books.

External links

1920 films
Films of the Weimar Republic
German silent feature films
Films directed by Erik Lund
German black-and-white films